The White River Valley Conference was a short-lived athletic conference in southwestern Indiana. The conference started off well, sponsoring both varsity and junior varsity contests mainly in basketball and track. However, after three years, Bloomfield would leave to help found the Southwestern Indiana Athletic Conference. The year after, Spencer followed suit. This caused Clay City to rejoin their county conference, leaving the remaining four schools (all in Greene County) to do the same.

Members

References

Indiana high school athletic conferences
High school sports conferences and leagues in the United States